was a counselor of the second rank in the Imperial court of Japan. The role dates from the 7th century.

The role was eliminated from the Imperial hierarchy in 701, but it was re-established in 705. This advisory position remained a part of the Imperial court from the 8th century until the Meiji period in the 19th century.

This became a Taihō Code office in the early feudal Japanese government or daijō-kan.

In the ranks of the Imperial bureaucracy, the Chūnagon came between the Dainagon (major counselors) and the Shōnagon (minor counselors).

The number of Chūnagon has varied, from three in 705 to four in 756.  There were eight in 1015; and in later years, there were up to ten Chūnagon at one time.

Chūnagon in context
Any exercise of meaningful powers of court officials in the pre-Meiji period reached its nadir during the years of the Tokugawa shogunate, and yet the core structures of ritsuryō government did manage to endure for centuries.

In order to appreciate the office of Chūnagon, it is necessary to evaluate its role in the traditional Japanese context of a durable yet flexible framework. This was a bureaucratic network and a hierarchy of functionaries.  The role of Chūnagon was an important element in the Daijō-kan (Council of State). The Daijō-kan schema proved to be adaptable in the creation of constitutional government in the modern period.

Highest Daijō-kan officials
The highest positions in the court hierarchy can be cataloged.  A dry list provides a superficial glimpse inside the complexity and inter-connected relationships of the Imperial court structure.
  Daijō-daijin (Chancellor of the Realm or Chief Minister). 
  Sadaijin (Minister of the Left).
  Udaijin (Minister of the Right).
  Naidaijin (Minister of the Center).

The next highest tier of officials were:
  Dainagon (Major counselor, chief counselor of state).  There are commonly three Dainagon;  sometimes more.
  Chūnagon (Middle counselor).
  Shōnagon (Minor counselor); there are commonly three Shōnagon.

Other high-ranking bureaucrats who function somewhat flexibly within the Daijō-kan were; 
 Sangi (Associate counselor).   This office functions as a manager of Daijō-kan activities within the palace.
   (Secretariat).  These are specifically named men who act at the sole discretion of the emperor.

The Eight Ministries
The government ministries were eight semi-independent bureaucracies.  A list alone cannot reveal much about the actual functioning of the Daijō-kan, but the broad hierarchical categories do suggest the way in which governmental functions were parsed:

Left

 Ministry of the Center. 
 Ministry of Civil Services; also known as the "Ministry of Legislative Direction and Public Instruction". 
 Ministry of Ceremonies; also known as the "Ministry of the Interior". 
 Ministry of Taxation.

Right
 Ministry of the Military.
 Ministry of Justice.
 Ministry of the Treasury.
 Ministry of the Imperial Household.

The specific ministries above are not grouped arbitrarily. The two court officials below had responsibility for them as follows:
   This administrator was charged or tasked with supervising four ministries: Center, Civil Services, Ceremonies, and Taxation.
   This administrator was charged or tasked with supervising four ministries: Military, Justice, Treasury and Imperial Household.

See also
 Daijō-kan
 Sesshō and Kampaku
 Kōkyū
 Kuge
 Imperial Household Agency
 Hamamatsu Chūnagon Monogatari
 Tsutsumi Chūnagon Monogatari
 Torikaebaya Monogatari

Notes

References
 Dickson, Walter G. and Mayo Williamson Hazeltine. (1898). "The Eight Boards of Government" in Japan. New York: P. F. Collier. OCLC 285881
 Kodansha. (1983). "Ukita Hideie", in Kodansha Encyclopedia of Japan. Tokyo: Kodansha. OCLC 233144013
 Nussbaum, Louis Frédéric and Käthe Roth. (2005). "Chunagon" in   Japan Encyclopedia. Cambridge: Harvard University Press. ; OCLC 48943301
 Ozaki, Yukio. (2001).  The Autobiography of Ozaki Yukio: The Struggle for Constitutional Government in Japan, translated by Fujiko Hara. Princeton: Princeton University Press. ; OCLC 123043741
 Titsingh, Isaac. (1834). Nihon Ōdai Ichiran; ou,  Annales des empereurs du Japon.  Paris: Royal Asiatic Society, Oriental Translation Fund of Great Britain and Ireland. OCLC 5850691
 Varley, H. Paul. (1980).  Jinnō Shōtōki: A Chronicle of Gods and Sovereigns. New York: Columbia University Press. ; OCLC 59145842

Further reading
 Dickenson, Walter G. (1869). Japan: Being a Sketch of the History, Government and Officers of the Empire. London: W. Blackwood and Sons. 

Government of feudal Japan
702 establishments
8th-century establishments in Japan